Janapada is a 2007 Indian Kannada-language drama film written and directed by Baraguru Ramachandrappa. The film was produced by G. Panju Poojari under the banner Sri Bhagirathi Enterprises. It features Raghav and Radhika Kumaraswamy in the lead roles. The supporting cast includes Nandini, Radha Ramachandra and Vathsala Mohan. The score and soundtrack for the film is by Hamsalekha and the cinematography is by Nagaraj Advani.

Cast 

 Raghava as Chandranna
 Radhika Kumaraswamy
 Nandini
 Radha Ramachandra
 Vathsala Mohan
 Pushpa Swamy
 Shobhina
 M. S. Umesh
 Sharath Lohithashwa
 Sundar Raj
 Karibasavaiah
 HMT Nanda

Soundtrack 

The film's background score and soundtrack were composed by Hamsalekha. The music rights were acquired by Lahari Music.

Awards 
Karnataka State Film Awards - Best Male Playback Singer – Hemanth

References

External links

2000s Kannada-language films
2007 drama films
2007 films
Indian drama films